Volha Silkina (born 27 May 1995) is a Belarusian modern pentathlete. She won the gold medal in the women's individual event at the 2019 World Modern Pentathlon Championships held in Budapest, Hungary. She also won the gold medal in the women's team event together with Anastasiya Prokopenko and Iryna Prasiantsova.

She competed at the European Modern Pentathlon Championships in 2017, 2018 and 2019.

She represented Belarus at the 2020 Summer Olympics in Tokyo, Japan.

References

External links 

Living people
1995 births
Belarusian female modern pentathletes
World Modern Pentathlon Championships medalists
Place of birth missing (living people)
Modern pentathletes at the 2020 Summer Olympics
Olympic modern pentathletes of Belarus
21st-century Belarusian women